Joakim Rune Austnes (born 20 February 1983) is a Norwegian former professional football forward. During his active career, he played for Aalesund and Viking in Tippeligaen.

Club career
Austnes played for Aalesund from 2001 to 2007, before he joined Viking ahead of the 2008-season.
He made his official debut for Viking as a 70th-minute substitute for Alexander Ødegaard in the 2008 season opener against Strømsgodset IF.

After the 2010 season, Austnes decided to step down from professional football and returned to his youth club Haramsøy/Nordøy FK.

International career
Austnes has played for the Norwegian U-19, U-20 and U-21-teams, making his debut 14 January 2003 in a match against Brazil.

References

1983 births
Living people
People from Haram, Norway
Norwegian footballers
Aalesunds FK players
Viking FK players
Norwegian First Division players
Eliteserien players
Sportspeople from Ålesund

Association football midfielders